David Poisson is the name of:

 David Poisson (politician) (born 1951), American politician
 David Poisson (alpine skier) (1982–2017), French alpine skier

See also
 Poisson (disambiguation)